Yaowang Shengchong Palace is a Taoist temple located on the northeast side of Sunyin Hill, beside the Liuyang River, in Liuyang, Hunan, China. The temple was first established in Tang dynasty (618-907), and the modern temple was founded in 2001 by the local government.

History
Yaowang Shengchong Palace was originally built in the Tang dynasty (618-907) and named after Sun Simiao, also known as King of Medicine who lived in seclusion here.

The temple was destroyed in the 26th Year of Period Zhizheng (1366) in the Yuan dynasty.

In the 3rd Year of Period Hongwu (1370) in Ming dynasty, a Taoist priest who named Wang Tanran collected money to rebuild the temple. In the 8th Year of Period Xuande (1433), it became a temple of Dragon Gate Taoism. In the 5th Year of Period Tianqi (1625), abbot Peng Siwei restored the temple.

The temple had a statue of Sun Simiao with 2.3 meters in height. In 1958, the local government vandalized the statue in the name of breaking down the feudal superstition.

In 1960, the Liuyang County Handicraft Cooperatives founded a galvanized wire factory in the temple. It was reconstruction in 2001 and became the site of Liuyang Daoist Association.

Gallery

References

Further reading

Buildings and structures in Liuyang
Taoist temples in Hunan
Tourist attractions in Changsha